Ugra-Karma is the second studio album by Finnish black metal band Impaled Nazarene. It was originally released on December 1, 1993 via Osmose Productions, and re-released in 1998 with two bonus tracks (taken from the Satanic Masowhore EP) and a different cover art, because the original one was taken without permission from a work by Madame Koslovsky; Osmose was sued because of that.

"Ugra-Karma" is a term in Sanskrit that denotes a bad, harmful action.

Track listing

Composition
 The song "Hate" contains a sample from the movie The Name of the Rose.

Personnel
Impaled Nazarene
 Mika Luttinen — vocals
 Kimmo Luttinen — drums, guitars
 Taneli Jarva — bass
 Jarno Anttila — guitars

Other staff
 Ahti Kortelainen — production
 Madame Koslovsky — cover art (original 1993 release; uncredited)
 Jean-Pascal Fournier — cover art (1998 re-issue)

References

External links
 Ugra-Karma at Discogs

1993 albums
Impaled Nazarene albums
Osmose Productions albums
Albums with cover art by Jean-Pascal Fournier